Shirkaj (also Romanized as Shīrkāj) is a village in Pain Khiyaban-e Litkuh Rural District, in the Central District of Amol County, Mazandaran Province, Iran. At the 2006 census, its population was 110, in 24 families.

References 

Populated places in Amol County